Ali Abu Hassun, also Abu al Hasan Abu Hasun or Abu Hasun, full name Abu al-Hasan Abu Hasun Ali ibn Muhammad (died September 1554), was a Regent of the Crown of Morocco for the Wattasid dynasty, during the 16th century.

Life 
In 1545, he succeeded Sultan Ahmad who had been taken prisoner by his southern rivals the Saadians. Ali Abu Hassun became regent for Ahmad's young son Nasir al-Qasiri.

Upon his accession, he decided to pledge allegiance to the Ottomans in order to obtain their support.

Ahmad came back after two years, and was able to rule from 1547 and 1549, until 1549 when Fez and then Tlemcen were conquered by his southern Saadian rivals under their leader Mohammed ash-Sheikh. Sultan Ahmad lost his life that year, and Ali Abu Hassun again became Regent, but as his country was occupied by the Saadians, he was offered asylum in Ottoman Algiers.

Following the reconquest of the Kingdom of Tlemcen over the Saadians in 1549, Ali Abu Hassun was able with the help of the Ottomans under Salah Rais to reconquer Fes in 1554. Ali Abu-Hassun was put in place as Sultan of Fez, supported by Janissaries. Ali Abu Hassun soon paid off the Turkish troops, and gave them the base of Peñon de Velez, which the Moroccans had reconquered in 1522.

The reconquest of Fes was short-lived however. Ali Abu Hassun was vanquished and killed by the Saadians at the Battle of Tadla in September 1554. Mohammed ash-Sheik was able to recapture the city of Fez and became the undisputed ruler of Morocco, establishing the Saadian dynasty as the sole ruler of the country. He then started negotiations with Spain to oust the Ottomans.

Notes

1554 deaths
16th-century Moroccan people
16th-century Berber people
16th-century monarchs in Africa
Year of birth unknown
Wattasid dynasty